Endocrine diseases are disorders of the endocrine system. The branch of medicine associated with endocrine disorders is known as endocrinology.

Types of disease
Broadly speaking, endocrine disorders may be subdivided into three groups:
 Endocrine gland hypofunction/hyposecretion (leading to hormone deficiency)
 Endocrine gland hyperfunction/hypersecretion (leading to hormone excess)
 Tumours (benign or malignant) of endocrine glands

Endocrine disorders are often quite complex, involving a mixed picture of hyposecretion and hypersecretion because of the feedback mechanisms involved in the endocrine system. For example, most forms of hyperthyroidism are associated with an excess of thyroid hormone and a low level of thyroid stimulating hormone.

List of diseases

Glucose homeostasis disorders 
 Diabetes
 Type 1 Diabetes
 Type 2 Diabetes
 Gestational Diabetes
 Mature Onset Diabetes of the Young
 Hypoglycemia
 Idiopathic hypoglycemia
 Insulinoma
 Glucagonoma

Thyroid disorders 
 Goitre
 Hyperthyroidism
 Graves-Basedow disease
 Toxic multinodular goitre
 Hypothyroidism
 Thyroiditis
 Hashimoto's thyroiditis
 Thyroid cancer
 Thyroid hormone resistance

Calcium homeostasis disorders and Metabolic bone disease 
 Parathyroid gland disorders
 Primary hyperparathyroidism
 Secondary hyperparathyroidism
 Tertiary hyperparathyroidism
 Hypoparathyroidism
 Pseudohypoparathyroidism
 Osteoporosis
 Osteitis deformans (Paget's disease of bone)
 Rickets
 Osteomalacia

Pituitary gland disorders

Posterior pituitary
 Diabetes insipidus
 Syndrome of Inappropriate Antidiuretic Hormone (SIADH)

Anterior pituitary
 Hypopituitarism (or Panhypopituitarism)
 Pituitary tumors
 Pituitary adenomas
 Prolactinoma (or Hyperprolactinemia)
 Acromegaly, gigantism, dwarfism
 Cushing's disease

Sex hormone disorders 
 Disorders of sex development or intersex disorders
 Hermaphroditism
 Gonadal dysgenesis
 Androgen insensitivity syndromes
 Hypogonadism (Gonadotropin deficiency)
 Inherited (genetic and chromosomal) disorders
 Kallmann syndrome
 Klinefelter syndrome
 Turner syndrome
 Acquired disorders
 Ovarian failure (also known as Premature Menopause)
 Testicular failure
 Disorders of Puberty
 Delayed puberty
 Precocious puberty
 Menstrual function or fertility disorders
 Amenorrhea
 Polycystic ovary syndrome

Tumours of the endocrine glands not mentioned elsewhere 

 Multiple endocrine neoplasia
 MEN type 1
 MEN type 2a
 MEN type 2b
 Carcinoid syndrome

See also separate organs 
 Autoimmune polyendocrine syndromes
 Incidentaloma - an unexpected finding on diagnostic imaging, often of endocrine glands

Endocrine emergencies
In endocrinology, medical emergencies include diabetic ketoacidosis, hyperosmolar hyperglycemic state, hypoglycemic coma, acute adrenocortical insufficiency, phaeochromocytoma crisis, hypercalcemic crisis, thyroid storm, myxoedema coma and pituitary apoplexy.

Emergencies arising from decompensated pheochromocytomas or parathyroid adenomas are sometimes referred for emergency resection when aggressive medical therapies fail to control the patient's state, however the surgical risks are significant, especially blood pressure lability and the possibility of cardiovascular collapse after resection (due to a brutal drop in respectively catecholamines and calcium, which must be compensated with gradual normalization). It remains debated when emergency surgery is appropriate as opposed to urgent or elective surgery after continued attempts to stabilize the patient, notably in view of newer and more efficient medications and protocols.

See also
 List of MeSH codes (C19)
 List of ICD-9 codes 240-279: Endocrine, nutritional and metabolic diseases, and immunity disorders

References

External links 

 
 

 
Endocrinology